The 1923 Howard Bulldogs football team was an American football team that represented Howard College (now known as the Samford University) as a member of the Southern Intercollegiate Athletic Association (SIAA) during the 1923 college football season. In their second year under head coach Harris G. Cope, the team compiled a 3–4–3 record.

Schedule

References

Howard
Samford Bulldogs football seasons
Howard Bulldogs football